Ivo Ivanov may refer to:
Ivo Dimitrov Ivanov (born 30 July 1966), Bulgarian businessman and co-owner of CSKA Sofia
Ivo Ivanov (footballer, born March 1985), Bulgarian footballer who plays for Beroe Stara Zagora
Ivo Ivanov (footballer, born April 1985), Bulgarian footballer who plays for CSKA Sofia and previously for Lokomotiv Sofia